Hamaguchi (written:  or ) is a Japanese surname. Notable people with the surname include:

, Japanese basketball player
, Japanese basketball coach
, Japanese volleyball player
, Japanese comedian
, 27th Prime Minister of Japan
, Japanese film director and screenwriter
, Japanese anime composer
, Japanese footballer
, Japanese motorcycle racer
, Japanese freestyle swimmer

Japanese-language surnames